Lorenzo Cristóbal Manuel Batlle y Grau (10 August 1810 in Montevideo – 8 May 1887 in Montevideo) was the president of Uruguay from 1868 to 1872.

Family background and early career
He was the son of a wealthy merchant loyal to the Spanish crown. Lorenzo Batlle's son José Batlle y Ordóñez, nephew Luis Batlle Berres and grand-nephew Jorge Batlle Ibáñez would also serve as presidents of Uruguay.

Lorenzo Batlle was a military officer and one of the distinguished members of the Colorado Party. He served as Minister of War three times (1847-1851, 1853-1854 and 1865-1868). He was Minister of Finance from 1856 to 1857. 

In March 1868 interim President Pedro Varela stepped down from the Presidency.

President of Uruguay
He was elected President of Uruguay, serving from 1868 to 1872.

His presidency failed because of a pre-existing monetary crisis. His attempts to control the country failed and, as a result, a civil war and military uprising erupted, culminating in his presidency and ushering in an era of dictatorship.

Death
He died as a poor man in 1887, but was respected as an historical figure for his attempts to help the country.

See also
 List of political families#Uruguay
 Colorado Party (Uruguay)

References

1810 births
1887 deaths
People from Montevideo
Presidents of Uruguay
Uruguayan people of Catalan descent
Ministers of Economics and Finance of Uruguay
Defence ministers of Uruguay
Colorado Party (Uruguay) politicians
19th-century Uruguayan people
Uruguayan National Army generals